Pidie Jaya Regency is a regency  in the Aceh Special region of Indonesia. It is located on the island of Sumatra. The regency was created out of part of Pidie Regency in 2007. The seat of the regency government is at Meureudu. The regency covers an area of 952.11 square kilometres and had a population of 132,956 people at the 2010 Census and 158,397 at the 2020 Census; the official estimate as at mid 2021 was 160,327.

Administrative divisions 

The regency is divided administratively into eight districts (kecamatan), listed below with their areas and their populations at the 2010 Census and the 2020 Census, together with the official estimates as at mid 2021. The table also includes the locations of the district administrative centres, the number of administrative villages (rural desa and urban kelurahan) in each district, and its post code.

See also 

 List of regencies and cities of Indonesia

References

External links 

 

 
Regencies of Aceh